Polythysana cinerascens is a species of moth of the family Saturniidae. It is found in Chile.

Larvae have been recorded on Lithraea caustica.

External links
saturniidae-web.de
The man who adopted a butterfly. An article about a man who became a Polythysana breeder in Chile

Saturniinae
Moths described in 1859
Endemic fauna of Chile